Krško Castle is a 12th-century castle ruin to the right of the Sava above the old center of the town of Krško, southeastern Slovenia. It stands in the territory of the settlement of Cesta. The castle and town are both named after the nearby Krka River.

History
Krško (together with Brestanica) was first mentioned in 895, when the Emperor Arnulf of Carinthia gave it to a loyal retainer, Valtun. It is not known whether the castle existed at that time, but it is assumed that it was erected shortly after 1100 by the noble house of Bogen, whose ministeriales were recorded as holding it as of 1154. The Counts Bogen may have obtained the lordship by marriage of Bertold II of Bogen to Seuhard, sister of Count Popo of Carniola.

In 1189, the castle was mentioned as Castrum Gurkeuelt, under the Bogen ministeriale Ortolf. In that year Adalbert of Bogen pawned it to Archbishop of Salzburg Adalbert III, a relative of his wife, for 800 Freising marks. A term of two years was set for the Bogens to redeem it; the money may have gone toward their participation in the Third Crusade.

The castle was still intact as of the late 17th century, when it was depicted in Valvasor's 1689 The Glory of the Duchy of Carniola.

References

Sources

 Ivan Jakič, Vsi slovenski gradovi, DZS, Ljubljana, 1997. 
 Ivan Lapajne, Krško in Krčani (reprint of 1894 issue), Zavod Neviodunum Krško, Krško, 2004. 
 Johann Weikhard von Valvasor, Slava vojvodine Kranjske, Mladinska knjiga, Ljubljana, 1978, Kultura imprint. 

Castle
Castles in Lower Carniola
Ruined castles in Slovenia